Angelica Moser (born 9 October 1997) is a Swiss athlete whose specialty is pole vaulting. She won the 2021 European Championships in Toruń and reached the final of the World Championships in Doha in 2019. Her personal bests in the event are 4.66 metres outdoors (Basel 2020) and 4.75 metres indoors (Toruń 2021).

Competition record

References

External links
 
 

 

1997 births
Living people
Swiss female pole vaulters
World Athletics Championships athletes for Switzerland
Sportspeople from Plano, Texas
Athletes (track and field) at the 2014 Summer Youth Olympics
Athletes (track and field) at the 2016 Summer Olympics
Olympic athletes of Switzerland
European Athletics Indoor Championships winners
Youth Olympic gold medalists for Switzerland
Youth Olympic gold medalists in athletics (track and field)
Athletes (track and field) at the 2020 Summer Olympics
20th-century Swiss women
21st-century Swiss women